Ian Jason Richards (born May 31, 1975) is a former county court judge in the Florida's 17th Judicial Circuit. Richards was the first African-American judge to be elected countywide in Broward County, Florida. He presided over State of Florida v. John Reasee, in which Richards jumped over his bench to protect a witness who was being attacked by the man against whom she had testified.

Early life and career

Richards, the son of a mechanic and registered nurse, grew up in South Florida. He attended Shadowlawn Elementary School in the heart of Liberty City, and later graduated from Miami Norland Senior High School. Richards earned his Bachelor of Accounting degree, in 1999, from Florida International University.  In 2002, Richards received a Juris Doctor degree from the University of Miami School of Law. Richards was a member of the UM Law School’s Honor Council.

Richards was defeated in a bid for re-election in 2014, despite his re-election effort being endorsed by major local newspapers.

Richards is married with three children.

Career achievements
 2002 to 2004 – Assistant State Attorney for the 11th Judicial Circuit
 2004 to 2008 – private attorney in South Florida
 2009 to 2014 – elected County Judge for the 17th Judicial Circuit

Richards is a member of the  Broward Bar Association, the Florida Bar Association, and Federal Bar Association

References

External links
 For Broward bench: Bailey, Richards (Sun-sentinel, October 13, 2014)
 Judges and Council Race Hinge on Name Recognition (South Florida Times, September 18, 2014)
 Judge Ian Richards' Interview with Rodney Baltimore from Hot 105
 Liberty City Upbringing Helped Judge Choose Law (Daily Business Review, May 19, 2014)
 Pines men accused of sex with boy, not revealing HIV status (Sun-Sentinel, January 17, 2013)
 Chad Johnson Judge Also a Tough Guy (Miami Herald, August 23, 2012)
 Judge Leaps to Protect Woman in Court (Miami Herald, March 25, 2009)
 The Herald recommends Ian Richards (Miami Herald, August 4, 2014)
 Re-elect Ian Richards, Ellen Feld to County Court (Sun-sentinel, August 13, 2014)

1975 births
African-American judges
Florida state court judges
Florida lawyers
21st-century American judges
21st-century American lawyers
Florida Democrats
Living people
People from Hollywood, Florida
People from Miramar, Florida
African-American people in Florida politics
American politicians of Jamaican descent
University of Miami School of Law alumni
Florida International University alumni
People from Broward County, Florida
Miami Norland Senior High School alumni
21st-century African-American people
20th-century African-American people